Ron Kouchi is a Democratic politician from Hawaii, representing the 8th district in the state Senate. He has served as the 14th President of the Hawaiʻi Senate since 2015.

Personal life
Ron Kouchi is married to Joy Naomi Tanimoto. He has two sons, Dan and Egan.

Career
Kouchi received his high school diploma from Waimea High School and attended Drake University in Des Moines, Iowa. He served as a lobbyist for the County of Kaua‘i at the Hawai‘i State Legislature and is a former member of the Legislative Committee of the Kaua'i Chamber of Commerce. He served for 22 years (11 terms) as a Kaua‘i County Councilman, including 12 years as Council Chair. He is a former director of the Kaua‘i Island Utility Cooperative (2003-2006) and the Kaua‘i Visitors Bureau. He served on the boards of the Kaua‘i Veterans Memorial Hospital and YMCA, and chaired the Wilcox Health Foundation’s capital campaign. He worked as a legislative analyst for the former Rep. Dennis Yamada in 1982, before getting appointed to the Senate (District 7) for the first time in 2010. Kouchi defeated John Sydney Yamane in the September 18 primary and Republican candidate David Hamman and Nonpartisan candidate Alfred Darling in the Hawaii State Senate elections 2010. He was elected to the Senate (District 8) in 2012. He has served as the Vice-Chair of the Committee on Agriculture, the Vice Chair of the Committee on Tourism, and the Majority Caucus Leader. He has sponsored 244 bills.

References

External links
 Ron Kouchi Official website

 

21st-century American politicians
Drake University alumni
Hawaii politicians of Japanese descent
Democratic Party Hawaii state senators
Presidents of the Hawaii Senate
Kauai County Council members
Living people
Year of birth missing (living people)